The 1946 Massachusetts general election was held on November 5, 1946, throughout Massachusetts. Primary elections took place on June 18.

At the federal level, Republican Henry Cabot Lodge Jr. was elected to the United States Senate over incumbent Senator David I. Walsh, and Republicans won nine of fourteen seats in the United States House of Representatives. Future President of the United States John F. Kennedy was elected to his first term in the House.

In the race for Governor, Republican Lt. Governor Robert F. Bradford defeated incumbent Democrat Maurice Tobin. Overall, Republicans won five of the six elected state-wide offices. Only incumbent Democratic Auditor Thomas J. Buckley retained his office.

Governor

Republican Lieutenant Governor Robert F. Bradford defeated incumbent Democratic Governor Maurice Tobin. Tobin survived a Democratic primary challenge from attorney Francis Harrigan, while Bradford was unopposed for the Republican nomination.

Lieutenant Governor
In the race for lieutenant governor, Republican State Senator Arthur W. Coolidge defeated Democratic former attorney general Paul A. Dever.

Republican primary
State Senator Arthur W. Coolidge defeated Lynn mayor Albert Cole in the Republican primary for Lieutenant Governor.

Democratic primary
Former Attorney General Paul A. Dever defeated Roger Putnam, Daniel J. O'Connell, and John B. Carr for the Democratic nomination for Lt. Governor.

General election

Secretary of the Commonwealth
Incumbent Republican Secretary of the Commonwealth Frederic W. Cook ran for re-election to a thirteenth two-year term in office.

The Democratic Party nominated Benedict F. Fitzgerald Jr.

The Socialist Labor Party nominated Malcolm T. Rowe.

Democratic primary

General election

Attorney General
Incumbent Republican Attorney General Clarence A. Barnes ran for re-election to a second consecutive term. He defeated Democratic former Lt. Governor Francis E. Kelly in the general election.

Democratic primary

General election

Treasurer and Receiver-General
Incumbent Democratic Treasurer and Receiver-General John E. Hurley ran for re-election to a second term in office. He was defeated by Republican former State Senator Laurence Curtis.

The Prohibition Party nominated Charles H. Vaughn, and the Socialist Labor party nominated Lawrence Gilfedder.

Democratic primary

Republican primary

General election

Auditor
Incumbent Democratic Auditor Thomas J. Buckley ran for re-election to a fourth term in office. He was re-elected narrowly over Republican Russell A. Wood.

The Prohibition Party nominated Robert A. Simmons, and the Socialist Labor Party nominated Pearl A. Votano.

Republican primary

Candidates
 Wallace E. Stearns, resident of the Back Bay and member of the Young Republicans
 Russell A. Wood, former Auditor and State Representative

Results

General election

United States Senate 

Incumbent Democratic Senator David I. Walsh ran for re-election to a fourth term. He was defeated by former Senator Henry Cabot Lodge Jr., who had resigned from Massachusetts's other Senate seat in order to serve in World War II.

United States House of Representatives

All of Massachusetts' fourteen seats in the United States House of Representatives were up for election in 1946.

Nine seats were won by Republican Party candidates. 

Twelve seats were won by candidates seeking re-election. The 4th District seat (based in Worcester) was won by Democrat Harold Donohue, defeating incumbent Republican Pehr Holmes. The 11th District seat (based in Boston and Cambridge) was won by John F. Kennedy after incumbent James Michael Curley vacated the seat to become Mayor of Boston.

See also
 155th Massachusetts General Court (1947–1948)

References

External links

 
Massachusetts